Jane Straus (May 18, 1954 – February 25, 2011) was an American writer whose works include The Blue Book of Grammar and Punctuation and Enough is Enough! Born in San Francisco, she studied at the University of California. She was the founder of GrammarBook.com and a "Relationship expert, author, radio host, and media guest."

References

External links
GrammarBook.com
Grammar and Punctuation with Jane on Youtube

American women writers
1954 births
2011 deaths
21st-century American women